Adam Ray may refer to:

Adam Ray (comedian) (born 1982), American comedian and actor
Adam E. Ray (1808–1865), American farmer politician